The Broken Arrow killings took place on July 22, 2015, when five members of the Bever family were murdered in Broken Arrow, Oklahoma, United States.

Daniel Bever (aged 12) called 9-1-1, saving the lives of his sisters Autumn (2) and Crystal (13) by alerting authorities. Crystal, one of the two survivors, identified two of her older brothers, 18-year-old Robert and 16-year-old Michael, as the assailants. The brothers were subsequently arrested and charged with five counts of first-degree murder and one count of assault and battery with intent to murder.

Details
At around 11:30 p.m. on July 22, 2015 police were alerted to 709 Magnolia Court by a 9-1-1 phone call made by 12-year-old Daniel Bever, who stated his brother was attacking the family. Screaming, commotion and a male voice were heard in the background before the line went dead. Dispatchers tracked the address by searching the number. After a failed attempt to contact the father, David Bever, they dispatched officers to the scene.

When police arrived, they saw blood around the porch of the house. They knocked on the door, heard a faint voice calling for help, and forced their way into the house, where they immediately found a 13-year-old girl, Crystal Bever, bleeding from multiple stab wounds. After pulling her out of the house, the officers discovered Daniel Bever and the rest of the victims, who were all dead. It was believed that one of the brothers responsible for the killings lured out the victims by pretending he was under attack.

Crystal survived the brutal killings but was critically injured from her wounds. She identified two of her brothers as the assailants in the familicide, saying that they lured her to a bedroom before slitting her throat and stabbing her in the stomach and arms. She underwent surgery at a nearby hospital and was listed as being in serious but stable condition. Two-year-old Autumn Bever was also found alive and unharmed with Crystal inside the house. The surviving children were put in state custody. 

The parents, as well as three children, were all stabbed to death. Knives, hatchets, and other bladed weapons were found at the scene, along with protective gear. Law enforcement officials said at least some of the weapons found were used in the killings.

Victims
Five people were killed in the familicide, and one other person was injured. A medical examiner determined that the common cause of death was "multiple sharp force injuries". Autopsies revealed the victims died between the late hours of July 22 and the early hours of July 23. The victims were identified as:

Killed
David Bever, 54 (father; killed by at least 28 stab wounds to the torso, face, neck and left arm and hand)
April Bever, 45 (mother; killed by blunt-force trauma and more than 48 wounds to the head, neck, torso and arms and hands)
Daniel Bever, 12 (brother; killed by 21 stab wounds to the back, shoulder and chest)
Christopher Bever, 6 (brother; killed by 21 stab wounds to the back, chest, shoulder and lower leg)
Victoria Bever, 5 (sister; killed by 23 stab wounds to both sides of the neck, her chest, back and upper arm)

Injured

Crystal Bever, 13 (sister; injured by a slit throat and stab wounds to the stomach and arms)

Motives and backgrounds of suspects
Neighbors said the Bever parents homeschooled their children and kept them from interacting with neighbors or other children. The family's lifestyle was reported to be so inconspicuous that some neighbors found out the full names of the entire family for the first time when the medical examiner released them. Neighbors also reported strange and unsettling behavior by Robert and Michael.

Defense attorneys stated that David Bever was physically and verbally abusive toward his children, according to Crystal's testimony. Robert claimed that both of his parents were abusive to him and the other siblings. He said his parents would often talk about people they hated and would refer to the biblical Armageddon as "a retribution thing for everything they hated about the world".

Robert confessed to committing the familicide. He claimed that he and his brother planned the act for some time and intended to commit a shooting spree outside the family, hoping it would rival and even outdo the 1999 Columbine High School massacre. Robert later confessed that he and his brother planned to dismember the bodies of their family, place them in storage bins and hide them in the attic of their home. He also stated that they planned to steal the family car, shoot and kill five random people each at multiple locations, and eventually achieve a body count of at least fifty people. An officer who interviewed Robert stated that he admired serial killers, hoped to strike in locations outside of Oklahoma, and wanted to achieve a body count of up to 500 people or more.

Aftermath
The two suspects fled the scene through the back door of the house when police arrived and headed into a wooded area behind the property. They were apprehended quickly with the use of a K9 unit and arrested without incident. The suspects were identified as 18-year-old Robert Bever, the oldest son of David and April Bever, and his 16-year-old brother, Michael Bever. Robert was armed with a knife at the time of his arrest.

One of the brothers "spontaneously uttered" that plans for the killings were stored on a flash drive inside the home. This flash drive was later retrieved by police when they searched the home for a second time. They also recovered computer equipment and video surveillance cameras, which they believed recorded the familicide as they were located near where three of the victims' bodies were found. It was later determined that the brothers planned to make two videos, one depicting the bodies of their family that would be shown to investigators and prosecutors, the other without the bodies that could be posted online.

Authorities have called the killings the "worst single criminal event in Broken Arrow history". The brothers were charged with five counts of first-degree murder and one count of assault and battery with intent to kill. On July 25, authorities announced that Michael Bever would be charged as an adult. 

A conviction on first-degree murder carries the punishment of life imprisonment or the death penalty. However, the Tulsa County District Attorney stated that Michael Bever would be exempt from a death sentence since he was under the age of 18 at the time of the familicide. 

Michael Bever's attorney argued against the constitutionality of the decision to try his client as an adult, stating that his client would die in prison and that it was the same as the death penalty. He argued Michael should be rehabilitated instead of imprisoned if he was physically and emotionally abused at home, although no evidence indicated any abuse occurring in the Bever home.

Investigators looked into a shipment of boxes containing a total of 3,000 rounds of ammunition that was believed to have been delivered on July 23. They also began investigating social media accounts belonging to Robert Bever.

On July 6, 2016, it was reported that Robert Bever had attempted suicide by hanging with a bed sheet. Tulsa County Sheriff's Office spokeswoman Casey Roebuck said the suicide attempt, occurring earlier that year on June 17, was discovered by a detention officer during a routine security check. Medical staff cut him down and checked him, determining he was uninjured. He was then moved to suicide watch.

In mid-February 2017, Broken Arrow's city council announced a plan to raise money through the Tulsa Community Foundation for the acquisition of the Bever family home. They hoped that enough money could be raised to purchase the house from the Bevers' mortgage holder and lending company, its then owner. If enough funds were raised, it was planned to tear the house down and, in its place, create a memorial park and garden, titled "The Bever Family-First Responders Memorial Park." The house was destroyed in a fire on March 18, 2017.  

On March 27, 2019, Reflection Park was dedicated in an official ceremony. A path meanders through a knoll of grass where the Bever house once stood.

Legal proceedings 
The brothers were arraigned in court on August 3. They pleaded not guilty to the charges filed against them.  A preliminary hearing was set for October 28. The date was later changed to October 9, and later to January 22, 2016. It was changed again to February 23, 2016.

On August 5, Tulsa County Judge Bill Musseman ruled that documents concerning the case be made public. They were released the next day, redacted to protect the victims' identities and sensitive information.

Robert Bever eventually pleaded guilty to all counts and was sentenced to life imprisonment without the possibility of parole. Michael Bever's trial began on April 16, 2018, and, on August 9, 2018, he was sentenced to life in prison with the possibility of parole. 

Robert is currently housed in the Joseph Harp Correctional Center and Michael is in the Lexington Correctional Center (both correctional centers are in Lexington, Oklahoma).

References

External links 
Original police report and suspects' jail screening records

Familicides
2015 in Oklahoma
Mass murder in 2015
Mass stabbings in the United States
Crimes in Oklahoma
Criminal duos
Stabbing attacks in 2015
Knife attacks
Mass murder in Oklahoma
Mass murder in the United States
Murder committed by minors